Jaffee is the surname of:

Al Jaffee (born 1921), American cartoonist best known for his work for Mad magazine
Elizabeth Jaffee, American medical researcher
Ellen Jaffee, member of the New York State Assembly
Irving Jaffee (1906-1981), American speed skater and double gold medalist at the 1932 Winter Olympics
Rami Jaffee (born 1969), American keyboardist of the rock band The Wallflowers
Sara Jaffee, American psychologist
Susan Nirah Jaffee, American screenwriter and television producer

See also

Jaffee v. Redmond, 518 U.S. 1 (1996)
Jaffe family
Jaffa (disambiguation)
Jaffe (disambiguation)
Joffa (disambiguation)
Joffe (disambiguation)

Surnames